El Algarrobal is a village in the Moquegua Region in Peru.

References

El Algarrobal